The Thirty-Third Wisconsin Legislature convened from  to  in regular session.

Senators representing even-numbered districts were newly elected for this session and were serving the first year of a two-year term. Assembly members were elected to a one-year term. Assembly members and even-numbered senators were elected in the general election of November 4, 1879. Senators representing odd-numbered districts were serving the second year of their two-year term, having been elected in the general election held on November 5, 1878.

Major events
 October 19, 1880: Wisconsin Supreme Court chief justice Edward George Ryan died in office. 
 November 2, 1880: James A. Garfield elected the 20th President of the United States.
 November 11, 1880: Governor William E. Smith appointed justice Orsamus Cole as the 6th chief justice of the Wisconsin Supreme Court.  On the same day, Smith appointed John B. Cassoday as associate justice.

Major legislation
 March 5, 1880: An Act to allow general accident insurance companies to do business in this state, 1880 Act 105.
 March 11, 1880: An Act to preserve and promote the public health in the city of Milwaukee, 1880 Act 206.  Criminalized the act of dumping waste or wastewater into any river or stream in Milwaukee.
 March 15, 1880: An Act to promote good order and repress crime, 1880 Act 238.  Created sentence-reduction incentives for good behavior by state prisoners.
 March 15, 1880: An Act for the prevention of cruelty to minors, 1880 Act 239. 
 March 15, 1880: An Act to prevent the adulteration of food and medicine and provide for analyzing the same, 1880 Act 252. 
 March 16, 1880: An Act relating to non-registered voters and amendatory of section twenty-four of the revised statutes of 1878, 1880 Act 315. Enabled unregistered voters to be eligible to vote with the assistance of a registered voter acting as witness for their eligibility.
 Joint Resolution amending sections numbers 4, 5, 11, and 21, article 4 of the constitution of the State of Wisconsin, 1880 Joint Resolution 9.  Proposed changing the terms for members of the Assembly from 1 year to 2 years, and for senators from 2 years to 4 years, and proposed that the legislature should be convened biennially, rather than annually.
 Joint Resolution proposing an amendment to section 1 of article 3 of the constitution of Wisconsin relating to suffrage, 1880 Joint Resolution 12.  Proposed an amendment to the state constitution to allow universal suffrage in Wisconsin for all people over age 21 who were citizens or recent immigrants intent on becoming citizens.

Party summary

Senate summary

Assembly summary

Sessions
 1st Regular session: January 14, 1880March 17, 1880

Leaders

Senate leadership
 President of the Senate: James M. Bingham (R)
 President pro tempore: Thomas B. Scott (R)

Assembly leadership
 Speaker of the Assembly: Alexander A. Arnold (R)

Members

Members of the Senate
Members of the Senate for the Thirty-Third Wisconsin Legislature:

Members of the Assembly
Members of the Assembly for the Thirty-Third Wisconsin Legislature:

Employees

Senate employees
 Chief Clerk: Charles E. Bross
 Assistant Clerk: J. F. A. Williams
 Bookkeeper: T. S. Ansley
 Engrossing Clerk: John P. Mitchell
 Enrolling Clerk: John P. Webster
 Transcribing Clerk: Gilbert Tennant
 Proofreader: Thomas A. Dyson
 Clerk for the Judiciary Committee: Walter L. Houser
 Clerk for the Committee on Claims: J. Lamborn
 Clerk for the Committee on Enrolled Bills: Charles Pinckney
 Clerk for the Committee on Engrossed Bills: Charles H. Darlington
 Document Clerk: William Graham
 Sergeant-at-Arms: Chalmers Ingersoll
 Assistant Sergeant-at-Arms: Daniel Harshman
 Postmaster: A. C. Fraser
 Assistant Postmaster: James E. Heg
 Gallery Attendants:
 Jacob Cleaver
 A. J. Barsantee
 Wash Room Attendant: William McCann
 Document Room Attendant: Frank S. Hatson
 Enrolling Room Attendant: H. R. Rawson
 Committee Room Attendant: Oscar M. Dering
 Doorkeepers: 
 M. Simon
 W. F. Cochran
 Edwin Rowclitt
 Louis Goeller
 Porter: W. L. Dowler
 Night Watch: G. H. Markstrom
 President's Messenger: Ralph Irish
 Chief Clerk's Messenger: J. G. Hyland
 Sergeant-at-Arms' Messenger: Edward N. Potter
 Messengers: 
 Charles Pierce
 Gustrave Mosier
 John Rindlaub
 T. Nelson
 Janitor: M. Finnerty

Assembly employees
 Chief Clerk: John E. Eldred
 1st Assistant Clerk: William M. Fogo
 2nd Assistant Clerk: Charles N. Herreid
 Bookkeeper: O. A. Southmayd
 Engrossing Clerk: P. H. Swift
 Enrolling Clerk: T. J. Vaughn
 Transcribing Clerk: C. H. Ladd
 Proof Reader: J. A. Ellis
 Sergeant-at-Arms: Daniel H. Pulcifer
 Assistant Sergeant-at-Arms: George W. Church
 Postmaster: W. W. Sturtevant
 Assistant Postmaster: T. M. Griswold
 Doorkeepers: 
 Isidore Lison
 George Seebald
 Dehart McLummins
 Charles A. Vaetz
 Gallery Attendant: Otto Comdohr
 Night Watch: W. R. Alban
 Room Attendants: 
 William Gillillan Jr.
 J. W. Dunn
 Speaker's Messenger: Paul R. Colvin
 Clerk's Messenger: Eddie Cavanaugh
 Sergeant-at-Arms' Messenger: Adolph Roeder
 Messengers:
 George Bean
 Hugh Edwards
 Thomas Jones
 Alma Marsden
 Frank Leonard
 Thomas Gillespie
 C. Hindrich
 J. Kohner
 Edwin Dahlby
 John Kempf

References

External links
 1880: Related Documents from Wisconsin Legislature

1880 in Wisconsin
Wisconsin
Wisconsin legislative sessions